The 1966 Southeastern 500 was a NASCAR Grand National Series event that was held on March 20, 1966, at Bristol International Speedway in the Bristol, Tennessee.

The transition to purpose-built racecars began in the early 1960s and occurred gradually over that decade.  Changes made to the sport by the late 1960s brought an end to the "strictly stock" vehicles of the 1950s.

Race report
Five hundred laps were done on a paved oval track spanning . The total time of the race was three hours, twenty-four minutes, and twenty-six seconds. There were seven cautions for 92 laps. Dick Hutcherson defeated Paul Lewis by outlapping him more than four times; resulting in Ford's 200th win. The Ray Nichels team had also used the #9 for Larry Frank's entry at Daytona earlier in the season. They also had Don White run multiple car numbers in the 1966 season, so they weren't always consistent with them.

Richard Petty had an injured finger and could not participate in this race; Jim Paschal had to take over as the relief driver.

Twenty-five thousand fans saw thirty-two drivers start a race that only seven would complete. Attrition levels were worse in this Bristol race than it is in the 2010 NASCAR Cup Series season; a rare instance where lower speeds on a track are more dangerous than faster speeds.

The total winnings for the race were $21,735 in American dollars ($ when inflation is taken into effect). Notable crew chiefs for this race were Bud Hartje, Frankie Scott, Jake Elder, Jack Sullivan and Herman Beam.

Qualifying

Finishing order
Section reference:

 Dick Hutcherson† (No. 29)
 Paul Lewis (No. 1)
 James Hylton (No. 48)
 Elmo Langley† (No. 64)
 Sam McQuagg† (No. 98)
 Gene Black† (No. 74)
 Bill Seifert (No. 45)
 Wendell Scott*† (No. 34)
 Henley Gray* (No. 97)
 G.C. Spencer*† (No. 49)
 Clyde Lynn*† (No. 20)
 Gene Cline* (No. 95)
 Johnny Allen* (No. 0)
 Larry Manning*† (No. 63)
 David Pearson*† (No. 6)
 Walter Wallace* (No. 73)
 J. D. McDuffie*† (No. 70)
 Marvin Panch* (No. 21)
 Ned Jarrett* (No. 11)
 Jim Paschal*† (No. 43)
 Paul Goldsmith* (No. 9)
 Fred Lorenzen* (No. 28)
 Bobby Isaac*† (No. 26)
 Cale Yarborough* (No. 27)
 Johnny Steele* (No. 2)
 J.T. Putney*† (No. 19)
 Buddy Arrington* (No. 67)
 Bobby Allison* (No. 24)
 Wayne Smith* (No. 38)
 John Sears*† (No. 04)
 Sonny Lamphear* (No. 96)
 E.J. Trivette* (No. 52)

† signifies that the driver is known to be deceased 
* Driver failed to finish race

Timeline
Section reference:

References

Southeastern 500
Southeastern 500
NASCAR races at Bristol Motor Speedway